Aula Al Ayoubi, born in 1973 in Damascus, is a Syrian painter and visual artist.

Biography 
Aula Al Ayoubi studied mathematics and educational sciences at the University of Damascus. She graduated from the Institute of Fine Arts of Damascus. She is a member of the Association of Fine Arts of Syria.

Works 
The collages of Aula Al Ayoubi mix different media. Her creations represent portraits of the most iconic women from her childhood, from Egyptian actress Faten Hamama to Lebanese singer Fairuz to the icon of Egyptian music Umm Kulthum. Punctuated with rich and colorful details, her dynamic compositions convey her own emotional feelings in front of these famous people.

The artist uses a bright and bold palette of colors and her collage technique gives her paintings a rich diversity of textures. Aula Al Ayoubi's works are exhibited in Syria and Kuwait. Her painting is also presented in private collections.

In 2015, she participated in the first international meeting of Mediterranean art, organized by Col·lectiu Mediterrani. Fourteen Spanish, Italian, Syrian, Moroccan and Turkish artists take part in a contemporary style exhibition mixing painting, sculpture, poetry or photography.

In 2017, Aula Al Ayoubi participated in the exhibition Radical Love: Female Lust bringing together nearly 50 women Arab artists around Arabic poetry written by women mainly between the 7th century and 12th century. As a response to President Donald Trump's ban on travel to the United States, artists anchor their works and illustrations in women's sexual pleasure.

Exhibitions 
 Solo Exhibition at Free Hand Gallery, Damascus, Syria, 2008
Solo Exhibition at Museum of Modern Art, Kuwait City, Kuwait, 2009
Solo Exhibition, Tilal Gallery, Shuwaikh, Kuwait, 2011
Solo Exhibition, Roaya Gallery, Jeddah, Saudi Arabia, 2012
Solo Exhibition, Markhiya Gallery, Doha, Qatar, 2012
Aula Al Ayouby, Tilal Gallery, Shuwaikh, Kuwait,  17–28 November 2013
 Trobada Internacional of Art Mediterrani, Col·lectiu Mediterrani, Es Polvorí Foundation, Dalt Vila, Baleares, 28 January – 25 February 2016
 Radical Love: Female Lust, The Crypt Gallery, London, 14 February – 5 March 2017
Seventeenth ArtsWorcester Biennial, Worcester MA, 2017
Solo Exhibition, ArtsWorcester Gallery, Worcester, MA, 2017
 'Spring Revolution' Beacon Gallery, Boston Massachusetts 7 June - 28 July 2019

References 

1973 births
Syrian women painters
Syrian contemporary artists
20th-century Syrian painters
21st-century Syrian painters
People from Damascus
Living people
20th-century women artists
21st-century women artists
Al-Ayoubi family